HNC may refer to:

Hydrogen isocyanide, a molecule with the formula HNC that is important to the field of astrochemistry
Heptanitrocubane, an experimental high explosive
Higher National Certificate, a higher education qualification in the United Kingdom
High Negotiations Committee, a Syrian political-military opposition bloc headquartered in Riyadh
Classical-map Hyper-Netted-Chain equation, a method in many-body theoretical physics for interacting uniform electron liquids in two and three dimensions
Hypernetted-chain equation, a closure relation to solve the Ornstein-Zernike equation commonly applied in statistical mechanics and fluid theory
Hopkins-Nanjing Center, a joint educational venture between Nanjing University and Johns Hopkins University located in Nanjing, China
Habits & Contradictions, album by Schoolboy Q
Huddersfield Narrow Canal, Northern England